Fred Marson (8 January 1900 – 1976) was an English footballer who played in the Football League for Sheffield Wednesday, Swansea Town and Wolverhampton Wanderers.

References

1900 births
1976 deaths
English footballers
Association football forwards
English Football League players
Darlaston Town (1874) F.C. players
Wolverhampton Wanderers F.C. players
Sheffield Wednesday F.C. players
Swansea City A.F.C. players
Telford United F.C. players
Shrewsbury Town F.C. players